The Giant is a 2020 French-American mystery crime thriller film written and directed by David Raboy and starring Odessa Young.  It is Raboy's feature directorial debut.

Plot summary

Cast
 Odessa Young as Charlotte
 Ben Schnetzer as Joe
 Jack Kilmer as Will
 Madelyn Cline as Olivia
 Danny Ramirez as Brady
 PJ Marshall as Rex

Release
The film premiered at the Toronto International Film Festival in September 2019. The film was released in North America on November 13, 2020, via Vertical Entertainment.

Reception
The film has a 43% rating on Rotten Tomatoes.

Andrew Barker of Variety gave the film a negative review and wrote "But Raboy gives us so little to hang onto – be it an arresting image, a palpable touch of the uncanny, or a moment of real tension – that it gets harder and harder to want to follow him."

Caryn James of The Hollywood Reporter also gave the film a negative review, calling it "Well-directed but hollow and tiresome."

References

External links
 
 

English-language French films
American mystery films
French mystery films
American crime thriller films
French crime thriller films
2019 crime thriller films
2010s French films